Edgar Davidson was a Hong Kong solicitor and member of the Legislative Council of Hong Kong.

He was a solicitor and of the Hastings & Co. firm. He was appointed to the Legislative Council in 1936 and 1937. He was held as a prisoner of war in the Stanley Internment Camp during the Japanese occupation of Hong Kong.

References

British solicitors
Solicitors of Hong Kong
Members of the Legislative Council of Hong Kong
Internees at Stanley Internment Camp